Spodnje Poljčane is a settlement on the left bank of the Dravinja River in the Municipality of Poljčane in northeastern Slovenia. The area is part of the traditional region of Styria. It is now included with the rest of the municipality in the Drava Statistical Region.

A Neo-Gothic chapel with a small belfry was built in the settlement in 1938.

References

External links
Spodnje Poljčane on Geopedia

Populated places in the Municipality of Poljčane